Samuel Beach Axtell (October 14, 1819 – August 6, 1891) was an American jurist and politician.  He is noted for serving as Chief Justice of the New Mexico Territorial Supreme Court, territorial Governor of Utah and New Mexico, and a two-term Congressman from California.

Early life
Axtell was born in Franklin County, Ohio, to a family of farmers. An ancestor was an officer in the American Revolutionary army and his grandfather was a Colonel of a New Jersey regiment during the War of 1812. He married Adaline S. Williams of Summit County, Ohio, September 20, 1840 and moved to Mt. Clemens, Michigan in 1843. Axtell was a graduate of the Western Reserve College at Oberlin, Ohio and was admitted to the bar in Ohio in the 1830s.

Life in California
In 1851, Axtell was caught up in the last days of the California Gold Rush. He moved to California and engaged in gold mining along the American River – in which he had little success. Upon the organization of California's counties he became interested in Politics and was elected district attorney of Amador County, holding this office for three terms. He moved to San Francisco in 1860, and was elected to the United States Congress as a Democrat, Representing California's First Congressional District in 1866 and re-elected 1868. He chose not to run for re-election and changed political parties to Republican.

Governor Axtell
President Ulysses Grant tapped Axtell to be the Governor of the Utah Territory in 1874. Axtell left office in June 1875 amid criticism from anti-Mormon elements in the Territory. Grant subsequently appointed him Governor of the New Mexico Territory, and he was inaugurated on July 30, 1875. Axtell's administration is best remembered for an inept response to two outbreaks of frontier violence: the Colfax County War and Lincoln County War.

In Colfax County, a long-running land dispute between the Maxwell Land Grant Company and local settlers boiled over in late 1875 following the murder of small-holder spokesman Reverend F.J. Tolby. Up to 200 people died in subsequent violence pitting settler vigilantes against pro-Company gangs. Governor Axtell was closely associated with the pro-Company "Santa Fe Ring." In 1876, responding to pro-settler verdicts by local juries, he suspended Colfax County's judicial powers. Axtell also dispatched a company of U.S. Army soldiers to arrest settler leader Clay Allison and three of his allies.

In Lincoln County, a business rivalry grew into a cycle of revenge killings between partisans of "The House" owned by James Dolan (supported by the Jesse Evans Gang) and the Lincoln County Regulators supporting competing businesses run by John Tunstall and Alexander McSween. Governor Axtell intervened on behalf of The House, using his authority to remove pro-Regulator officials and shift legal authority to those supporting Dolan. This decision may have been influenced by the Attorney General of the New Mexico Territory, Thomas Catron, who held a mortgage on Dolan's property.

Accusations of corruption and misconduct led Secretary of the Interior Carl Schurz (R) to initiate an investigation into Axtell's activities as governor. Frank Angell, the investigating agent, would later describe Governor Axtell's administration as having more "corruption, fraud, mismanagement, plots and murder" than any other governor in the history of the United States. Based on Angell's investigation, Secretary Schurz suspended the Governor on September 4, 1878. 

President Rutherford B. Hayes (R) then appointed General Lew Wallace to replace Axtell later that year.

Chief justice
Despite the corruption, no criminal charges were brought against Axtell. Indeed, he was still seen as a prominent political figure in New Mexico. After a brief cooling-off period, he was appointed chief justice of the New Mexico Territorial Supreme Court in 1882. He resigned in May 1885 after Grover Cleveland (R) was elected president, and planned to remove Axtell from the office.

In 1890 he was elected chairman of the New Mexico Territorial Republican Committee.

He died at Morristown, New Jersey.

Legacy
Despite his total failure as governor, he was a brilliant jurist, and that is his political legacy. On the bench he endeavored at all times to secure what he saw fit to designate as "substantial justice" for all litigants, and judicial precedents which interfered with the main object of trials in his court, or with equity from his standpoint, were ruthlessly cast aside. However, his time on the bench was still marked with corruption, and many found his method of authority dictatorial. He often cast out any jury's opinion when he did not agree with it.

He is most remembered for two cases:

In a celebrated criminal trial at Las Vegas, New Mexico, Axtell had been warned that his life would be forfeited if he dared to sit in the case. Axtell took the bench, and promptly opened court on time. He compelled the sheriff to search all of the court attendants and the spectators before he allowed the case to proceed. As a result, forty-two revolvers were piled on the table, some having been taken from the attorneys in the case. Each man carrying a weapon into the court room was fined ten dollars for contempt of court, and no show of resistance was made when the fine was collected. The event was heavily covered in newspapers as a "triumph of law over the lawlessness" of the Wild West.

In another case before him the defendant, a poor young man, whose farm was in jeopardy, had no attorney. Seeing that the case was going against the man unless he could obtain legal counsel, Judge Axtell descended from the bench and began conducting the cross-examination with the remark: "It takes thirteen men to steal a poor boy's farm in New Mexico." Upon the conclusion of the submission of evidence, he instructed the jury to find a verdict on behalf of the defendant. When the foreman announced a disagreement, the judge discharged the jury, announced a verdict in behalf of the defendant, and told the sheriff never to allow any one of the discharged jurymen to serve again in San Miguel County. This case was the epitome of his dictatorial use of authority, but it was seen that he did it for the common good.

References

External links
 

1819 births
1891 deaths
People from Franklin County, Ohio
Utah Republicans
New Mexico Republicans
Governors of New Mexico Territory
Governors of Utah Territory
Members of the United States House of Representatives from California
19th-century American politicians
Democratic Party members of the United States House of Representatives from California
New Mexico Territory judges